The Savage Sword of Conan was a black-and-white magazine-format comic book series published beginning in 1974 by Curtis Magazines, an imprint of American company Marvel Comics, and then later by Marvel itself. Savage Sword of Conan starred Robert E. Howard's most famous creation, Conan the Barbarian, and has the distinction of being the longest-surviving title of the short-lived Curtis imprint.

As a "magazine", Savage Sword of Conan did not have to conform to the Comics Code Authority, making it a publication of choice for many illustrators. It soon became one of the most popular comic series of the 1970s and is now considered a cult classic. Roy Thomas was the editor and primary writer for the series' first few years (until issue 60), which featured art by illustrators such as Neal Adams, Dick Giordano, Barry Windsor-Smith, John Buscema, Alfredo Alcala, Jim Starlin, Al Milgrom, Pablo Marcos, and Walter Simonson. Painted covers were provided by such artists as Earl Norem, Bob Larkin, and Joe Jusko.

Savage Sword of Conan was published under the Curtis imprint until issue 60, when it became part of the Marvel Magazine Group. Stories from the comic were reprinted in the Marvel UK title of the same name. The original run of Savage Sword of Conan ran until issue #235 (July 1995).

Marvel Comics reacquired the publishing rights in 2018, and started a new run of Savage Sword of Conan collected editions beginning in February 2019. In 2022, Titan Comics acquired the license to reprint the magazine in new collected editions.

Publication history 
The adventures in Savage Sword of Conan are not always consecutive (as they are in the color Marvel title Conan the Barbarian), and they cover different eras of Conan's life. The Savage Sword stories mostly feature an older Conan, and adapt Robert E. Howard stories and pastiches starting from "Black Colossus" (according to the Miller/Clark chronology), thus following the Roy Thomas stories in Conan the Barbarian.

The first issue leads off with Thomas and Barry Windsor-Smith's adaptation of one of Howard's shortest but most well-known Conan tales, "The Frost Giant's Daughter". This is one of Conan’s earliest tales chronologically. Still a teenager, he encounters a beautiful woman in the frozen north who leads him into an ambush by her giant brothers. Issue #2 featured another Howard adaptation, "Black Colossus", in which Conan faces off against a three-thousand-year-old sorcerer. This story teams long time Conan penciler John Buscema with his frequent partner Alcala. The cover of issue #5 sports a Boris Vallejo painting of Conan being crucified, from the story "A Witch Shall Be Born". This story features Conan at his most resilient, surviving a desert crucifixion to get revenge on the man who put him there.

Issues #6-10 included "People of the Dark", a 30-page tale scripted by Thomas and drawn by Alex Niño; the continued adaptation of Howard’s only full-length Conan novel, The Hour of the Dragon (the first parts having been printed in Giant-Size Conan #1-4); and the adaptation of "Iron Shadows in the Moon", by Buscema and Alcala, where Conan goes from chief of the Zuagirs to pirate captain of the Red Brotherhood.

The next three years of the title featured numerous adaptations of Howard stories (many by the art team of Buscema and Alcala), including "Shadows in Zamboula", "The Devil in Iron", "The People of the Black Circle", "The Slithering Shadow", "The Pool of the Black One", "The Tower of the Elephant", "Jewels of Gwahlur", "Beyond the Black River", "The Scarlet Citadel", "The Flame Knife", "Hawks Over Shem", "The Treasure of Tranicos", and "Wolves Beyond the Border".

Collected editions

In 2007, Dark Horse Comics began issuing a series of trade paperbacks, collecting and reprinting early issues of the title, as well as stories which originally appeared in Savage Tales.The full series was reprinted as the Chronicles of Conan in 34 volumes with new colors. In 2018 when Marvel resumed the rights it began publishing its own collected editions of original Marvel material. In 2022, Titan Comics acquired the license to reprint the magazine in new collected editions.

Marvel Omnibus Collected Editions

Awards
The comic won the "Comic" British Fantasy Award in 1975 and 1976.

See also 
 Conan (comics)
 Conan (Marvel Comics)

Notes

References 

 
 

Conan the Barbarian comics
Dark Horse Comics titles
Marvel UK titles
1974 comics debuts
1995 comics endings
Comics by Archie Goodwin (comics)
Comics by Doug Moench
Comics by Gerry Conway
Comics by J. M. DeMatteis
Comics by Michael Fleisher
Comics by Neal Adams
Comics by Roy Thomas